
Year 908 (CMVIII) was a leap year starting on Friday (link will display the full calendar) of the Julian calendar.

Events 
 By place 

 Byzantine Empire 
 May 15 – The three-year-old Constantine VII, the son of Emperor Leo VI (the Wise), is crowned as co-emperor of the Byzantine Empire by Patriarch Euthymius I at Constantinople. The ceremony is held in the Hagia Sophia. After the rituals, Constantine is crowned (symbolically) and becomes Leo's successor.

 Europe 
 August 3 – Battle of Eisenach: An invading Hungarian force defeats the East Frankish army under Duke Burchard, killing him, together with Duke Egino and Rudolf I, bishop of Würzburg. The Hungarians devastate Thuringia and Saxony as far north as Bremen, returning home with many spoils.Chronicon Hermanni Contracti: Ex Inedito Hucusque Codice Augiensi, Unacum Eius Vita Et Continuatione A Bertholdo eius discipulo scripta. Praemittuntur Varia Anecdota. Subiicitur Chronicon Petershusanum Ineditum. 1, Typis San-Blasianis, 1790, p. CVIII, Text from: Gesta Francorum excerpta, ex originali ampliata, Latin text: "980 [...] Ungari in Saxones. Et Burchardus dux Toringorum, et Reodulfus epsicopus, Eginoque aliique quamplurimi occisi sunt devastata terra...". English translation: "908 [...] The Hungarians against the Saxons. Burchard, duke of Thuringia, bishop Rudolf, and Egino were killed with many others and [the Hungarians] devastated the land...".
 Duke Atenulf I (the Great) of Benevento attacks the Saracens at the Garigliano River, with the assistance of Naples and Amalfi. Crossing the river, Atenulf defeats an Arab army and reaches the walls of their fortified camp. However, the sudden withdrawal of the Neapolitans renders the siege useless.

 Ireland 
 September 13 – Battle of Belach Mugna: In an alliance with the kings Cerball mac Muirecáin of Leinster, Cathal mac Conchobair of Connacht, and Cellach mac Cerbaill of Osraige, High King Flann Sinna defeats the forces of King Cormac mac Cuilennáin of Munster near Castledermot (County Kildare).

 Arabian Empire 
 December 17 – Husayn ibn Hamdan leads a revolt to depose the newly-appointed Abbasid Caliph Al-Muqtadir in Baghdad. He installs his uncle Abdallah ibn al-Mu'tazz and kills vizier Al-Abbas ibn al-Hasan al-Jarjara'i, but fails to murder Al-Muqtadir. This leads, finally, to the coup's collapse.
 Winter – Snow falls in Baghdad. According to Arabic writings, even rivers are frozen.

 China 
 March 26 – Emperor Taizu (Zhu Wen) of Later Liang has the 15-year-old Li Zhu, the last Tang Dynasty emperor, poisoned. Li Zhu receives the posthumous name of Ai ("lamentable").
 May 1 – Emperor Wang Jian of Former Shu puts his adoptive son (and a potential successor) Wang Zongji (Prince of Shu) to death. He orders Wang Zongji's associates to be exiled.
 June 9 – The generals Zhang Hao and Xu Wen assassinate Yang Wo (Prince of Hongnong). He is succeeded by his 11-year-old brother Yang Longyan as ruler of the Wu Kingdom.
 June 18 – Xu Wen murders Zhang Hao and takes over as Yang Longyan's regent, and sole commander of the imperial guard. He becomes de facto ruler of the Wu Kingdom.

Births 
 Al-Muttaqi, Abbasid caliph (d. 968)
 Guo Chong, Chinese general (approximate date)
 Ibrahim ibn Sinan, Abbasid mathematician (d. 946)
 Kiyohara no Motosuke, Japanese nobleman (d. 990)
 Thankmar, Frankish prince (approximate date)

Deaths 
 February 23 – Li Keyong, Shatuo governor (b. 856)
 March 25 – Li Kening, Chinese general
 March 26 – Ai, emperor of the Tang Dynasty (b. 892)
 April 25 – Zhang Wenwei, Chinese chancellor
 May 1 – Wang Zongji, Chinese prince and pretender
 June 9 – Yang Wo, emperor of Wu (b. 886)
 June 18 – Zhang Hao, Chinese general
 August 3 
 Burchard, duke of Thuringia
 Egino, duke of Thuringia
 Rudolf I, bishop of Würzburg
 August 13 – Al-Muktafi, Abbasid caliph
 September 13 – Cormac mac Cuilennáin, king of Munster (Ireland)
 December 17 
 Al-Abbas ibn al-Hasan al-Jarjara'i, Abbasid vizier
 Abdallah ibn al-Mu'tazz, Abbasid poet (b. 861)
 Blaise of Amorion, Byzantine monk and missionary
 Cléirchén mac Murchadh, king of Maigh Seóla (Ireland)
 Denewulf, bishop of Winchester
 Li Sijian, Chinese warlord and governor
 Remigius of Auxerre, Frankish scholar
 Wang Shifan, Chinese warlord (b. 874)
 Xuefeng Yicun, Chinese Chan master (b. 822)

References